Moving In may refer to:

 Moving In (album), a 1996 Chris Potter recording
 "Moving In", the European title for the 1984 film known as Firstborn in North America
 "Moving In", an episode of As Time Goes By
 "Moving In!", an episode of The Raccoons
 "Moving In", an episode of Rob & Big
 "Moving In", a former TV-show on MTV.

See also 
 "Joey and the Moving In", an episode of Joey
 Moving (disambiguation)
 Movin' On (disambiguation)